The House of Lords Precedence Act 1539 (31 Hen 8 c 10) is an Act of the Parliament of England. It prescribed the order of precedence of members of the House of Lords. However, some of it has since been superseded or repealed, and so for the full order of precedence today other sources should also be consulted.

This Act was partly in force in Great Britain at the end of 2010.

Provisions
The Act set the order of precedence as the Sovereign's children, the "Vicegerent" (Thomas Cromwell), the Archbishop of Canterbury, the Archbishop of York, the bishops, the Lord Chancellor, the Lord High Treasurer, the Lord President of the King's Council, the Lord Privy Seal, the Lord Great Chamberlain, the Lord Constable, the Earl Marshal, the Lord High Admiral, the Lord Steward and the King's Chamberlain, followed by all other dukes, marquesses, earls, viscounts and barons.

Preamble
The appointment of Thomas Cromwell to the new office of vicegerent, which had been made in the interval between the Parliament of 1536, and that of 1539, the latter of these assemblies seized the earliest moment of confirming by their recognition; avoiding, however, the appearance of the necessity of their sanction, by introducing the fact of appointment and the description of the office into the preamble of this statute,  where a matter so weighty otherwise appears to be exceedingly misplaced.

Section 2
This section, except the words from "And foreasmuch" to "Churche of England", was repealed by Schedule 1 to the Statute Law Revision Act 1948. The unrepealed words are introductory words describing the Sovereign as Head of the Church.

Section 9
This section was repealed by section 83(3) of, and Part III of Schedule 10 to, the Criminal Justice Act 1948.

Section 10
In this section, the words "in the Sterr Chamber and" were repealed by Schedule 1 to the Statute Law Revision Act 1948.

See also
Orders of precedence in the United Kingdom

References

Bibliography
Halsbury's Statutes of England and Wales. Fourth Edition. 2010 Reissue. Volume 10(1). Page 101.

External links
The House of Lords Precedence Act 1539, as amended, from the National Archives.

Acts of the Parliament of England (1485–1603)
Acts of the Parliament of the United Kingdom concerning the House of Lords
1539 in law
1539 in England